Xie Chuntao (born February 1963) is a Chinese writer and politician currently serving as vice president of the Central Party School of the Chinese Communist Party.

He was an alternate member of the 19th Central Committee of the Chinese Communist Party.

Biography
Xie was born in Linshu County, Shandong, in February 1963. He attended Shandong Normal University where he received his bachelor's degree in politics in 1982. After completing his master's degree in the history of the Chinese Communist Party from Hangzhou University in 1985, he entered the Renmin University of China where he obtained his doctor's degree in the history of the Chinese Communist Party in 1988. 

Xie joined the Chinese Communist Party (CCP) in July 1985. Beginning in July 1988, he served in several posts in the Central Party School of the Chinese Communist Party, including deputy director and then director of Teaching and Research Office, president and chief editor of the Central Party School Press, and director of Academic Affairs Department. In May 2018, he was promoted to vice president of the Central Party School of the Chinese Communist Party. In June 2022, he was promoted again to become a ministerial level vice president.

Publications

References

1963 births
Living people
People from Linshu County
Shandong Normal University alumni
Hangzhou University alumni
Renmin University of China alumni
People's Republic of China politicians from Shandong
Chinese Communist Party politicians from Shandong
Academic staff of the Central Party School of the Chinese Communist Party
Alternate members of the 19th Central Committee of the Chinese Communist Party